KIAA0895 is a protein that in Homo sapiens is encoded by the KIAA0895 gene. The gene encodes a protein commonly known as the KIAA0895 protein. It's aliases include hypothetical protein LOC23366, OTTHUMP00000206979, OTTHUMP00000206980, 9530077C05Rik, and 1110003N12Rik. It is located at 7p14.2.

Research into the KIAA proteins has shown that they are similar to known genes with functions related to cell signaling/communication, cell structure/motility and nucleic acid management.



Gene

Locus 
The KIAA0895 gene is located at 7p14.2. The genomic DNA is 65,976 base pairs long, while the longest mRNA that it produces is 4463 bases long.

It can be transcribed into 15 transcript variants, which in turn can produce 13 different isoforms of the protein.

Gene Neighborhood 
KIAA0895 is surrounded by the following genes on chromosome 7:
EEPD1
MARK2P7
ANLN
LOC111365168
AOAH

Size of gene 
The gene encoded for the KIAA0895 protein is 65,975 nucleotides long, from nucleotides 36324150 to 36390125, with seven exons.

mRNA 
There are ten different isoforms for KIAA0895. 
NP_001093895.1
EAW94064.1
NP_056129.2
NP_001186636.1
NP_001186635.1
XP_005249746.1
EAW94065.1
XP_024302470.1
NP_001186637.1
NP_001287885.1

Protein
The longest protein isoform that is produced by the KIAA0895 gene is termed LOC23366 isoform 1 and is 520 amino acids long. The predicted molecular weight is 61kDa. Additionally, the theoretical isoelectric point is 10.

Amino acid composition 
KIAA0895 is a lysine and arginine semi-enriched protein. KIAA0895 is semi-enriched in positively charged lysine and arginine groups, and positively and negatively charged lysine, arginine, glutamic acid and aspartic acid groups. However, KIAA0895 is semi-depleted in non-polar alanine, glycine and proline groups.

The charge distribution analysis shows that there are no negative or mixed charge clusters. However, there is one positive charge cluster from amino acids 12 to 36.

Regions
LOC23366 contains a protein domain of unknown function called DUF1704. It also contains a region of low complexity from position 120 to position 150 in the protein, and an arginine-rich area from position 12 to position 51.

Promoters 
Using ElDorado by Genomatrix, a promoter region sequence was found. The most likely promoter for KIAA0895 starts at 36389926 and goes to 36391149, with a length of 1224.

Post-translational modification
KIAA0895 is predicted to undergo phosphorylation at several serines, threonines, and tyrosines throughout its structure. Phosphorylation at these sites is a form of gene regulation. Phosphorylation results in a conformational change in the structure of many enzymes and receptors. This causes them to become activated or deactivated.

Stem loops 
Using a database called Mfold, a stem-loop formation for the 5' UTR region shows that there is a lack of conservation, meaning there is some precedence that these stems and loops are not used for translation regulation. The ΔG value was -12.90 kcal/mol with three loops. Using the same database, a stem-loop formation for the 3' UTR region shows that there is conservation, meaning there is some precedence that they are used for translation regulation. The ΔG value was -636.80 kcal/mol.

Tertiary structure 
KIAA0895 has a tertiary structure with alpha helices and beta sheets.

Interacting proteins 
There are three proteins likely to be interacting proteins with KIAA0895. These proteins are ELAVL1, vata, and glym. These interactions have experimental evidence from the sources provided.

Expression 
KIAA0895 is most commonly found in the testis, however it also has a strong expression in the kidneys, adrenal glands, and brain.

Per Health State 
Using an EST profile from NCBI, KIAA0895 has strong expression in cervical tumors and bladder carcinoma.

Interacting proteins 
Using three different databases, three different interacting proteins were found. These include ELAVL1, VATA, and GLYM. There was experimental evidence for all three of these interacting proteins.

Homologs and orthologs
KIAA0895 has over 228 orthologs. Orthologs have been found in mammals and eukaryotes. There are homologs in 9 species. The full list of organisms in which homologs have been found is given below.

Pan troglodytes
Macaca mulatta
Canis lupus familiaris
Bos taurus
Mus musculus
Rattus
Gallus gallus domesticus
Danio rerio
Anura

Paralogs 
KIAA0895 has 7 paralogs in Homo sapiens:
Unnamed protein product
Uncharacterized protein KIAA0895-like
hCG28832, isoform CRA_a
Hypothetical protein
Unnamed protein product
hCG38687, isoform CRA_a, partial
hCG38687, isoform CRA_b

References 

Human proteins